Polk County is a county located in the U.S. state of North Carolina. As of the 2020 census, the population was 19,328. Its county seat is Columbus. The county was formed in 1855 from parts of Henderson and Rutherford counties.  It was named for William Polk, a colonel in the American Revolutionary War. The Tryon International Equestrian Center, close to the community of Mill Spring was the location of the 2018 FEI World Equestrian Games.

Geography

It is the fifth-smallest county in North Carolina by total area.

Lake Adger is a reservoir formed by the damming of the Green River, which flows from west to east across the county. The northern extent of the river's watershed forms the northern border of the county.

Polk County is divided into two physiographic regions; the Blue Ridge Mountains in the western third of the county and Piedmont for the eastern two-thirds. Since it is in a transition zone between the two regions, Polk County is often referred to as being in the foothills.

State and local protected areas 
 Anne Elizabeth Suratt Nature Center
 Bradley Nature Preserve at Alexander's Ford (part)
 Chimney Rock State Park (part)
 Green River Game Lands (part)
 Shunkawauken Falls

Major water bodies 
 Broad River
 Green River
 Hughes Creek
 Lake Adger
 Little White Oak Creek
 Ostin Creek
 Walnut Creek
 White Oak Creek

Adjacent counties
 Rutherford County - northeast
 Spartanburg County, South Carolina - south-southeast
 Greenville County, South Carolina - south-southwest
 Henderson County - west

Major highways
 
 
 
 
 

The interchange for I-26 and the US 74 freeway is located in Columbus. Interstate 26 provides Polk County with access to Asheville and Spartanburg, SC.

Polk County is also served by an additional non-freeway U.S. Highway: US 176. This was the primary highway linking Saluda and Tryon to Hendersonville and Spartanburg, S.C. prior to the delayed completion of I-26 in 1976. Two North Carolina routes, NC 108 and NC 9, traverse the county as well. NC 108 begins in Rutherfordton and travels west through Columbus and ends at US 176 in Tryon. Oriented north-to-south, NC 9 connects Black Mountain and Lake Lure to Spartanburg and points southeast via Polk County. NC 108 and NC 9 intersect at the unincorporated town of Mill Spring.

Polk County and Saluda are infamous among railroad enthusiasts for the Saluda Grade, the steepest standard-gauge mainline railway grade in the United States. Norfolk Southern suspended freight traffic indefinitely along this route in December 2001. The track remains in place, but are cut near Flat Rock, North Carolina and Landrum, South Carolina.

Demographics

2020 census

As of the 2020 United States census, there were 19,328 people, 9,071 households, and 5,550 families residing in the county.

2000 census
As of the census of 2000, there were 18,324 people, 7,908 households, and 5,337 families residing in the county.  The population density was 77 people per square mile (30/km2).  There were 9,192 housing units at an average density of 39 per square mile (15/km2).  The racial makeup of the county was 92.26% White, 5.89% Black or African American, 0.19% Native American, 0.24% Asian, 0.03% Pacific Islander, 0.63% from other races, and 0.76% from two or more races.  3.01% of the population were Hispanic or Latino of any race.

As of the census of 2000 the largest self-reported ancestry groups were:
 English - 17%
 Irish - 13%
 German - 13%
 Scotch-Irish - 7%
 African American- 5.89%
 Scottish - 4%
 Italian - 3%

There were 7,908 households, out of which 23.50% had children under the age of 18 living with them, 56.30% were married couples living together, 7.90% had a female householder with no husband present, and 32.50% were non-families. 28.90% of all households were made up of individuals, and 15.00% had someone living alone who was 65 years of age or older.  The average household size was 2.28 and the average family size was 2.78.

In the county, the population was spread out, with 20.10% under the age of 18, 5.80% from 18 to 24, 24.20% from 25 to 44, 26.30% from 45 to 64, and 23.60% who were 65 years of age or older.  The median age was 45 years. For every 100 females there were 90.20 males.  For every 100 females age 18 and over, there were 87.10 males.

The median income for a household in the county was $36,259, and the median income for a family was $45,096. Males had a median income of $29,375 versus $23,070 for females. The per capita income for the county was $19,804.  10.10% of the population and 6.40% of families were below the poverty line.   11.70% of those under the age of 18 and 8.80% of those 65 and older were living below the poverty line.

Law and government
Polk County is a member of the Isothermal Planning and Development Commission regional council of governments. Sheila Whitmire is the current (as of 2012) Registrar of Deeds and Patrick McCool serves as the current mayor of Columbus, the county seat.

Government and politics

2016 elections
In the 2016 Republican Primary in Polk County, Donald Trump received 1,624 votes (or 46.2% of the total votes) followed by Ted Cruz who came in second with 1,135 votes (or 32.3% of the total votes).  In the 2016 Democratic Primary, Bernie Sanders received 1,123 votes (48.7% of the total) whereas Hillary Clinton won 1,099 votes (47.7% of the total).  In the general election Donald Trump received 6,768 votes (or 61.9% of the total vote) whereas Hillary Clinton received 3,735 votes (34.2% of the vote) and Libertarian Candidate Gary Johnson received 272 votes (2.5% of total votes in the county).

Communities

City
 Saluda

Towns
 Columbus (county seat)
 Tryon (largest town)

Townships
 Columbus
 Cooper's Gap
 Green Creek
 Saluda
 Tryon
 White Oak ("Mill Spring")

See also
 List of counties in North Carolina
 National Register of Historic Places listings in Polk County, North Carolina
 North Carolina State Parks

References

External links

 
 
 NCGenWeb Polk County  - free genealogy resources for the county
 BlueRidgeNow.com - The Times-News Online

 
Counties of Appalachia
1855 establishments in North Carolina
Populated places established in 1855